"My Life Is a Party" is a song by German dance group ItaloBrothers. The song was released in Germany as a digital download on July 27, 2012. The song has charted in Austria, Germany and Switzerland. The song heavily samples the song "Dragostea din tei" by O-Zone.

Music video
A music video to accompany  the release of "My Life Is a Party" was first released onto YouTube on July 25, 2012 at a total length of three minutes and forty-three seconds. It is the second song to feature a Dragostea din tei sample, the other being Live Your Life. The video was shot in Palma de Mallorca, Spain.

Track listing
 Digital download
 "My Life Is a Party" (R.I.O. Edit) - 3:27
 "My Life Is a Party" (Club Mix) - 5:03
 "My Life Is a Party" (Radio Edit) - 3:12
 "My Life Is a Party" (Extended Mix) - 4:45
 "My Life Is a Party" (Whirlmond Remix) - 5:05
 "My Life Is a Party" (Ryan T. & Rick M. Radio Edit) - 3:30
 "My Life Is a Party" (Ryan T. & Rick M. Remix) - 5:00

Chart performance

Certifications

Release history

References

External links
 ItaloBrothers Official Website
 ItaloBrothers on Facebook
 ItaloBrothers on Twitter
 ItaloBrothers on MySpace
 ItaloBrothers YouTube channel

2012 singles
ItaloBrothers songs
2012 songs
Songs about dancing
Songs about parties